Burchinal may refer to:

 Burchinal, Iowa, USA
 David A. Burchinal (1915-1990), American general